Florencia Mandrile  (born 10 February 1988) is an Argentine former footballer who played as a midfielder. She was part of the Argentina women's national football team  at the 2008 Summer Olympics.

See also
 Argentina at the 2008 Summer Olympics

References

External links
 
http://www.gettyimages.com/detail/news-photo/florencia-mandrile-of-argentina-vies-with-kara-lang-of-news-photo/82191941#florencia-mandrile-of-argentina-vies-with-kara-lang-of-canada-during-picture-id82191941

1988 births
Living people
Argentine women's footballers
Argentina women's international footballers
Place of birth missing (living people)
Footballers at the 2008 Summer Olympics
Olympic footballers of Argentina
Women's association football midfielders
2007 FIFA Women's World Cup players